Lutricia Bock (born 8 May 1999) is a German figure skater. She is the 2014 CS Volvo Open Cup silver medalist and the 2016 German national champion.

Personal life 
Lutricia Bock was born in Chemnitz, Germany. Her brother, Wendelin, is an ice dancer.

Career 
Bock debuted on the ISU Junior Grand Prix circuit in 2012, placing 15th in Chemnitz, Germany. She then won junior ladies' titles at the Tirnavia Ice Cup and 2013 German Championships.

Bock received two 2013–14 Junior Grand Prix assignments. She finished seventh overall at the event in Riga, Latvia with a technical element score of 49.76 points for her long program. In Kosice, Slovakia, she achieved a technical score of 29.69 for her short program and placed sixth overall. Her technical scores met minimum requirements for all ISU Championships. After successfully defending her junior national title at the 2014 German Nationals, she was assigned to the 2014 World Junior Championships in Sofia, Bulgaria, where she finished 12th.

Competing in the 2014–15 JGP series, Bock placed ninth in Ostrava, Czech Republic and fourth in Dresden, Germany. In November 2014, she made her senior international debut, winning silver at the CS Volvo Open Cup. Her first senior national medal, bronze, came at the 2015 German Championships.

In December 2015, Bock won gold at the German Championships in Essen. Ranked first in the short program and second in the free skate, she finished ahead of silver medalist Nathalie Weinzierl by a margin of 1.83 points. Bock did not reach the final at 2016 European Championships, placing 25th in the short program.

Due to a stumble while on her way to the ice rink on 15 December 2016, Bock tore the inner meniscus of her left knee. She underwent an operation a week later and resumed skating in mid-March 2017.

Programs

Results 
CS: Challenger Series; JGP: Junior Grand Prix

References 

 2014 German Junior Ladies Figure Skating Championships
 2013 German Junior Ladies Figure Skating Championships
 2012 German Junior Ladies Figure Skating Championships
 2011 German Novice Ladies Figure Skating Championships

External links 
 
 
 Lutricia Bock at Tracings.net

1999 births
Living people
German female single skaters
Sportspeople from Chemnitz